Hanau Hauptbahnhof is a railway station in Hanau in the German state of Hesse, and is a major railway junction east of Frankfurt am Main. It was opened in 1867, but the current building was built in the late 1960s. It is classified by Deutsche Bahn (DB) as a category 2 station and has many train services, including Intercity Express, regional and S-Bahn services.

Links
Hanau Hauptbahnhof is a central hub of the railway network that is served by six routes. It is served by:
 Frankfurt-Hanau Railway (Hanau–Maintal–Frankfurt)
 Main-Spessart Railway (Hanau–Kahl–Aschaffenburg)
 Frankfurt-Bebra Railway
 towards the east: Kinzig Valley Railway, Hanau–Fulda–Göttingen
 towards the west: Offenbach am Main–Frankfurt am Main, as the South Main S-Bahn
 Friedberg–Hanau railway to Friedberg
 Odenwald Railway (Hanau–Groß-Umstadt Wiebelsbach–Eberbach)

History
Today's Hanau Hauptbahnhof was opened on 1 May 1867 on the route of the Frankfurt–Bebra railway as a temporary terminus called Hanau Ost (east). The first station in Hanau was opened in 1848 as the terminus of the Frankfurt-Hanau Railway Company (Frankfurt-Hanauer Eisenbahn-Gesellschaft), which is west of central Hanau at the site of the current Hanau West station.

Hanau Ost station was built at the junction between the extension of the Frankfurt-Hanau railway (which runs on the north bank of the Main) connecting with the Main–Spessart railway to Aschaffenburg and the Kinzig Valley Railway to Bebra. Its position was chosen to allow the building of a bridge over the Main to Steinheim as part of the south bank route to Frankfurt. At the same time Hanau depot (Bahnbetriebswerk Hanau) was built at Heideäcker. An entrance building was built at Hanau Ost on the island between the line towards Fulda (northern tracks) and the line to Aschaffenburg (southern tracks).

The constraints imposed by the position of the crossing of the Main explain why the station was built so far from the centre of the city, which is still a significant problem for public transport in Hanau: two centres must be served: the Hauptbahnhof and the downtown bus junction in Freiheitsplatz. Until the end of the Second World War, the station served a tram line of the Hanau Tramway (Hanauer Straßenbahn).

On 15 May 1927, the station was renamed from Hanau Ost station to Hanau Hauptbahnhof.

The original station building was demolished in 1966 and replaced by a building north of the tracks with a spacious station forecourt. The original location as an island station can still be recognised from the track numbering and road connections between the tracks to the nearby park and ride facility. The floor level of the main level of the new station was determined by the location of the existing pedestrian underpass, which was retained. Since the station was built partly in a former river bed of the Main, there will always be problems with water penetration, especially after storms. The passenger accessible part of the entrance building was transformed fundamentally in the early 1990s with the reorganisation of baggage and express freight operations.

Operations

Long-distance services

Hanau station is classified by Deutsche Bahn (DB) as a category 2 station. It is connected by Intercity-Express and Intercity services to cities in a large part of Germany and some cities outside Germany.

Regional services

Hanau station is served by several Regional-Express and Regionalbahn lines. Since 1995 it has also been served by lines S8 and S9 of the Rhine-Main S-Bahn. There is also a central bus station in the station forecourt.

Notes

References

External links

Hauptbahnhof
Rhine-Main S-Bahn stations
Main-Kinzig-Kreis
Railway stations in Germany opened in 1867